Ricardo Trogi (born March 25, 1970) is a Canadian filmmaker, director and actor.

Career
Trogi was born in Quebec City, Quebec. His first two films, Québec-Montréal, about seven twenty-something travellers driving between the two cities, and Dodging the Clock (Horloge biologique), a look at three men and their decisions about having children, were both critical and commercial hits, with Quebec-Montréal receiving four Jutra Awards. His third feature titled 1981, a semi-autobiographical film about a boy's coming of age, was released in September 2009; it was followed by the sequel films 1987 in 2014 and 1991 in 2018.

In addition to film work, Trogi also directed the 2004-2005 television series Smash and the 2020 comedy series La Maison-Bleue.

Awards 
Jutra Award for Best Director, Québec-Montréal (2003)
Prix Iris for Best Director, 1991 (2019)

Filmography

Director
Films
2002: Québec-Montréal
2005: Dodging the Clock (Horloge biologique) 
2009: 1981
2014: 1987
2015: The Mirage (Le Mirage)
2016: 9 (9, le film): Segment "Fuite"
2018: 1991
2021: The Guide to the Perfect Family (Le guide de la famille parfaite)
TBA: 1994-1995

TV series
1988: La Course destination monde (TV documentary series)
2004: Smash (TV mini-series)  
2006: La chambre no 13 (TV mini-series) 
2007: Les étoiles filantes (TV series) 
2011: Malenfant (TV series)
2016: Les Simone (TV series)
2020: La Maison-Bleue

Screenwriter
2002: Québec-Montréal
2005: Dodging the Clock 
2009: 1981

Actor
2002: Québec-Montréal as a police agent
2009: 1981 as narrator
2010: Face Time (Le Baiser du barbu) as Frank
2014: 1987 as narrator

References

External links 

1970 births
French Quebecers
Living people
Male actors from Quebec City
Film directors from Quebec
Canadian people of Italian descent
Canadian television directors
Best Director Jutra and Iris Award winners